The Girl with a Patron is a 1925 German silent comedy film directed by Max Mack and starring Ossi Oswalda, Willy Fritsch, and Nora Gregor. It was shot at the Babelsberg Studios in Berlin. It was one of a number of popular comedies released by UFA during the era alongside its more prestigious art films.

Cast

References

Bibliography

External links

1925 films
1926 comedy films
1926 films
Films of the Weimar Republic
German silent feature films
German comedy films
Films directed by Max Mack
UFA GmbH films
Films produced by Erich Pommer
German black-and-white films
1925 comedy films
Silent comedy films
1920s German films
Films shot at Babelsberg Studios